Juan Francisco Jimenez Romano (born 16 March 1981 in Castelló de la Plana, Castellón) is an S8 swimmer from Spain. He competed at the 1996 Summer Paralympics, winning a bronze medal in the 4 x 100 meter 34 Points freestyle men's race. He competed at the 2000 Summer Paralympics, winning a silver medal in the 400 meter freestyle and a bronze medal in the 100 metre freestyle.

References

External links 
 
 
 

1981 births
Living people
Sportspeople from Valencia
Spanish male freestyle swimmers
Spanish male backstroke swimmers
Paralympic swimmers of Spain
Paralympic silver medalists for Spain
Paralympic bronze medalists for Spain
Paralympic medalists in swimming
Swimmers at the 1996 Summer Paralympics
Swimmers at the 2000 Summer Paralympics
Swimmers at the 2004 Summer Paralympics
Medalists at the 1996 Summer Paralympics
Medalists at the 2000 Summer Paralympics
S8-classified Paralympic swimmers